TeleXitos is an American Spanish language digital multicast television network owned by NBCUniversal Telemundo Enterprises, a subsidiary of the NBCUniversal Filmed and Entertainment division of NBCUniversal (itself a division of Comcast). Aimed at the Hispanic and Latin American community, the network airs a mix of dramatic television series from the 1970s to the 2000s and movies, with all programming consisting of shows dubbed into Spanish.

History

Telenovela format as Éxitos TV

The network traces its origins to Éxitos TV, a digital multicast network launched by Telemundo Station Group on January 28, 2012; Éxitos primarily focused on reruns of telenovelas from the 1990s and 2000s that were previously broadcast on sister network Telemundo. The network was initially launched on the digital subchannels of Telemundo's owned-and-operated stations.

Relaunch as TeleXitos
On December 1, 2014, the Telemundo Station Group relaunched Éxitos as TeleXitos. The new format of the network would shift to focus on Spanish-dubbed reruns of drama and action series from the 1970s to the early 2000s, which in effect made the network a companion service with sister network Cozi TV and a competitor to several English language multicast networks specializing in archived programming including MeTV, Antenna TV and the Retro Television Network – with TeleXitos becoming the first Spanish language network in the U.S. to focus on classic television programs. Telemundo Station Group chose to change the network's format in response to research illustrating the limited availability of action and adventure programs in Spanish. Barbara Alfonso, who previously served as programming and community marketing manager at NBC's Miami owned-and-operated station WTVJ, was appointed as director of network operations, handling responsibility of programming acquisitions, national advertising sales and digital operations.

Programming
TeleXitos' programming focuses primarily on action and adventure series and feature films from the 1970s to the 2000s, aimed primarily at males between the ages of 25 and 54 years old. Much of the network's series acquisitions are sourced primarily from the programming library of corporate sister NBCUniversal Television Distribution (including shows from Universal Television, Revue Studios, NBC Studios and MCA Television), although it features select programs from other distributors. The network was designed to complement existing programming content on sister network Telemundo, with stations affiliated with that network being given the option of scheduling daily blocks of local news, sports and special events programming in place of shows airing on the national TeleXitos feed. All of the network's content is presented in Spanish, consisting of dubbed versions originally intended for syndication in Latin American countries (incidentally, parent network Telemundo has long incorporated Spanish-dubbed versions of English-language films among its feature film content, which generally air in weekend prime time slots).

TeleXitos also broadcasts feature films each Monday through Friday from 9:00 to 11:00 a.m. and 5:00 to 7:00 p.m.; and Saturdays and Sundays from 1:00 p.m. to 2:00 a.m. and 3:00 to 5:00 a.m. Eastern Time (sometimes starting earlier or ending later depending on the length of the films), with the film roster focusing on action, adventure, comedy film, Drama and western releases from the 1970s to the 2010s. Films featured on the network consist of releases by Universal Pictures, Sony Pictures, Lionsgate and 20th Century Studios.

Scripted programming 
 The A-Team (December 1, 2014–present)
 Hercules: The Legendary Journeys (December 1, 2014–present)
 Homicide: Life on the Street (December 1, 2014–present)
 Law & Order (December 1, 2014–present)
 Miami Vice (December 1, 2014–present)
 Xena: Warrior Princess (December 1, 2014–present)
 Knight Rider (December 1, 2014–present)
 Zorro (2014 - present)

Reality programming 
 Funniest Pets & People (December 1, 2014–present)
 Ripley's Believe It or Not (December 1, 2014–present)

Children's programming  
 Xploration Station
 Godzilla: The Series (2022–present)
 Men in Black: The Series (2022–present)
 The Real Ghostbusters (2022-present)
 Animal Science (2021–present)
 Awesome Planet (2021–present)

Former programming

Drama series 
 T. J. Hooker (December 1, 2014 – August 2, 2015)

Children’s programming 
 Digimon Adventure
 Guess with Jess
 He-Man and the Masters of the Universe
 Pic Me
 Pokémon
 Pucca
 Raggs
 She-Ra: Princess of Power
 Sonic X
 The Adventures of Dudley the Dragon
 Tinga Tinga Tales 
 Thomas & Friends
 VeggieTales (Now on TBN and Smile)
 Wow! Wow! Wubbzy!

Affiliates
, TeleXitos has current or pending affiliation agreements with television stations in 17 media markets encompassing 10 states (including stations in eight of the ten largest Nielsen markets), covering 27% of the United States.

NBCUniversal currently broadcasts TeleXitos in most markets served by a station owned by the NBCUniversal Owned Television Stations group, either on subchannels of its Telemundo and NBC owned-and-operated stations. The network is also available on the digital subchannels of other television stations, primarily those affiliated with Telemundo. The network is available to stations on a barter basis, in which TeleXitos and its affiliates split the responsibility of selling advertising inventory as well as the commercial time allocated each hour.

The network initially launched in markets reaching approximately 20 million American households with at least one television set, as well as more than 4.5 million households with Latino and Hispanic residents. Telemundo Station Group immediately sought carriage of the network on the digital subchannels of television stations owned by other broadcasting companies (such as ZGS Communications) that own Telemundo-affiliated stations. The network was also initially made available on Comcast Xfinity's Miami and West Palm Beach systems on digital channel 229.

List of some affiliates

Former affiliates

See also
 Cozi TV – co-owned English language digital broadcast network, specializing in classic television series from the 1950s to the 1980s.
 Me-TV – competing digital broadcast network owned by Weigel Broadcasting, specializing in classic television series from the 1950s to the 1980s.
 Decades – competing digital broadcast network owned by Weigel Broadcasting and CBS Television Stations, specializing in classic television series from the 1950s to the 1980s as well as archival news programming.
 Antenna TV – competing digital broadcast network owned by Nexstar Media Group, specializing in classic television series from the 1950s to the 1990s.
 Buzzr – competing digital broadcast network owned by  FremantleMedia North America, specializing in classic television game shows.
 Bounce TV – competing digital broadcast network owned by Bounce Media LLC, featuring television series and movies targeting an African-American audience.
 Grit – competing digital broadcast network owned by Bounce Media LLC, featuring television series and movies targeting a male audience.
 Retro TV – competing digital broadcast network owned by Luken Communications specializing in classic television series from the 1950s to the 1970s, along with select recent programming.
 This TV – competing digital broadcast network owned by Allen Media Group, primarily featuring movies as well as a limited amount of classic television series.

References

External links
 

Telemundo Station Group
Television networks in the United States
Companies based in New York City
NBCUniversal networks
Telemundo
Spanish-language television networks in the United States
Television channels and stations established in 2012